Birsingha Bhagabati Vidyalaya is one of the oldest schools in the village Birsingha of sub-division Ghatal, Paschim Medinipur, West Bengal, India. Pandit Iswar Chandra Vidyasagar founded this school and named it for his mother, Bhagawati Devi. It is a co-ed Higher Secondary School.

The school follows the course curricula of West Bengal Board of Secondary Education (WBBSE) and West Bengal Council of Higher Secondary Education (WBCHSE) for Standard 10th and 12th Board examinations respectively.

References 

High schools and secondary schools in West Bengal
Schools in Paschim Medinipur district
1890 establishments in India
Educational institutions established in 1890